The Communauté de communes Pays Fort Sancerrois Val de Loire is a communauté de communes, an intercommunal structure, in the Cher department, in the Centre-Val de Loire region, central France. It was created in January 2017 by the merger of the former communautés de communes Cœur du Pays Fort, Haut-Berry - Val de Loire and  Sancerrois. Its area is 688.0 km2, and its population was 18,476 in 2018. Its seat is in Sancerre.

Communes
The communauté de communes consists of the following 36 communes:

Assigny
Bannay
Barlieu
Belleville-sur-Loire
Boulleret
Bué
Concressault
Couargues
Crézancy-en-Sancerre
Dampierre-en-Crot
Feux
Gardefort
Jalognes
Jars
Léré
Menetou-Râtel
Ménétréol-sous-Sancerre
Le Noyer
Saint-Bouize
Sainte-Gemme-en-Sancerrois
Saint-Satur
Sancerre
Santranges
Savigny-en-Sancerre
Sens-Beaujeu
Subligny
Sury-en-Vaux
Sury-ès-Bois
Sury-près-Léré
Thauvenay
Thou
Vailly-sur-Sauldre
Veaugues
Verdigny
Villegenon
Vinon

References

Pays Fort Sancerrois Val de Loire
Pays Fort Sancerrois Val de Loire